Kition (Ancient Greek: , ; Latin: Egyptian: ; Phoenician: , , or ,) was a Ancient Greek city-kingdom on the southern coast of Cyprus (in present-day Larnaca). According to the text on the plaque closest to the excavation pit of the Kathari site (as of 2013), it was established in the 13th century BC by Greek (Achaean) settlers, after the Trojan war.

Its most famous, and probably only known, resident was Zeno of Citium, born c. 334 BC in Citium and founder of the Stoic school of philosophy which he taught in Athens from about 300 BC.

Name
Citium is the Latinised form of the Ancient Greek name .

History
The city-kingdom was originally established in the 13th century BC by Greek (Achaean) settlers, after the Trojan war.

Mycenaeans first settled in the area for the purpose of the exploitation of copper, but the settlement eventually faded two centuries later as a result of constant disarray and anxiety of the time.

New cultural elements appearing between 1200 BC and 1000 BC (personal objects, pottery, new architectural forms and ideas) are indications of significant political changes after the arrival of the Achaeans, the first Greek colonists of Kition. 

Early in the 12th century BC the town was rebuilt on a larger scale; its mudbrick city wall was replaced by a cyclopean wall. Around 1000 BC, the religious part of the city was abandoned, although life seems to have continued in other areas as indicated by finds in tombs.

Literary evidence suggests an early Phoenician presence also at Kition which was under Tyrian rule at the beginning of the 10th century BC. Some Phoenician merchants who were believed to come from Tyre colonized the area and expanded the political influence of Kition. After c. 850 BC the sanctuaries [at the Kathari site] were rebuilt and reused by the Phoenicians."

The kingdom was under Egyptian domination from 570 to 545 BC. Persia ruled Cyprus from 545 BC. Kings of the city are referred to by name from 500 BC—in Phoenician texts and as inscriptions on coins.

Marguerite Yon claims that literary texts and inscriptions suggest that by the Classical period Kition was one of the principal local powers, along with its neighbour Salamis. In 499 BC Cypriot kingdoms (including Kition) joined Ionia's revolt against Persia.

Persian rule of Cyprus ended in 332 BC.

Ptolemy I conquered Cyprus in 312 BC and killed Poumyathon, the Phoenician king of Kition, and burned the temples. Shortly afterwards the Cypriot city-kingdoms were dissolved and the Phoenician dynasty of Kition was abolished. Following these events the area lost its religious character.

However, a trading colony from Kition established at Piraeus had prospered to the point that, in 233 BC they requested and received permission for the construction of a temple dedicated to Astarte".

Cyprus was annexed by Rome in 58 BC.

Strong  earthquakes hit the city in 76 AD and the year after, but the city seems to have been prosperous during Roman times. A curator civitatis, or financial administrator of the city, was sent to Kition from Rome during the rule of Septimius Severus.

Earthquakes of 322 and 342 AD "caused the destruction not only of Kition but also of Salamis and Pafos".

The Kition archaeological sites
Kition was first systematically excavated by the Swedish Cyprus Archaeological Expedition in 1929 (under the direction of Einar Gjerstad).

Archaeology is continuing near the Kathari site. A magnificent 20m-long Roman mosaic showing the labours of Hercules was discovered in a baths building in 2016. It was found under Kyriakou Matsi Street when clearing a sewer and is expected to be transferred to the museum.

The Kathari site (a.k.a. Area II)

This site is located around 500 metres north of the Bamboula site and sometimes referred to as "Kition Area II". The Department of Antiquities (under the direction of Vassos Karageorghis) started excavating in 1959 continuing until 1981.

Excavations have revealed part of a defensive wall, dating from the 13th century BC and remains of five temples including cyclopean walls. The largest temple's (horizontal) dimensions were 35 m by 22 m. and was built using ashlar blocks. Temple (2) was rebuilt—around 1200 BC. Temple (1) has Late Bronze Age graffiti of ships on the façade of the south wall.

The Bamboula site

The site is located around 50 metres north of the Larnaca Museum.
In 1845 the Sargon Stele was found here, together with a gilded silver plakette now in the Louvre.

A British Expedition first excavated the site in 1913.

A French team from the University of Lyon started excavating in 1976. when traces of settlement dating to the tenth century BC were found along ramparts next to the port at Bamboula. The site also consists of a sanctuary of Astarte and a sanctuary of Melkart. The earliest sanctuary was built in the 9th century BC.

1987 saw the discovery of the Phoenician harbour for warships built in the 5th century BC. In its final stage, it consisted of ship sheds (six of them have been recorded), 6 metres wide and about 38 to 39 meters long, with shipways on which triremes were pulled up to dry under tiled roofs

Other archaeological sites at Kition
Five built tombs—hypogeum is another name for this type of tombs—have been discovered at Kition—the Vangelis Tomb, Godham's Tomb, the Phaneromeni, and the Turabi Tekke tomb. Two important stele with inscriptions in the Phoenician script were found in the Turabi Tekke cemetery in the late nineteenth century. They are now in the British Museum's collection.

Kition Area I, "close to the west [city] wall of the Pre-Phoenician period, seems to have been a residential area" according to architectural and moveable finds. "Kition Area III" and "-IV" are names of other archaeological sites at Kition.

The "mound gate" in the city wall was located in the vicinity northwest of the Phaneromeni Tomb.

There was also an acropolis.

Necropolis
Sophocles Hadjisavvas has said that "the necropolis of Kition is the most extensively investigated burial ground on the island of Cyprus". "The necropolis [of Kition] extends from the Ayios Prodromos and the area of Agios Ioannis "Pervolia" and "Mnemata" (Northern Necropolis) to Ayios Georghios Kontos and the Chrysosotiros church (Soteros quarter), (Western Necropolis)." A "part of the Kition necropolis became the subject of rescue work at the site of Agios Prodromos".

The Mnemata Site

Other uses of the name
One sports club uses the name Kition - AEK Kition.

See also 
City-state
History of Cyprus
Kittim
Lefkaritis Tomb
Ship shed
Zeno of Citium

References

Citations

Bibliography

 .

External links

The port of the Kingdom of Kition 
Photos: Ancient Ruins of Kition Kathari
StoryMap (S. Fourrier, A. Rabot): Kition, Larnaca

Archaeological sites in Cyprus
Mycenaean Greece
Bronze Age Cyprus
City-states
Former populated places in Cyprus
Phoenician colonies in Cyprus
Cities in ancient Cyprus